The Railroad Museum of Oklahoma is a railroad museum located in the former Atchison, Topeka and Santa Fe Railway freight depot in Enid, Oklahoma. The museum began in 1977 and is a non-profit operated by the Enid chapter of the National Railway Historical Society.  The freight depot was listed on the National Register of Historic Places in 2015.

The museum's collection includes two rooms of operating HO and N-gauge model railroads, a reference library, dining car china, and other railroad artifacts. Engines and rolling stock in its collection include the Frisco 1519 steam locomotive, an operational 50-ton G.E. switcher locomotive, nine authentic cabooses, five different kinds of boxcars, twelve different types of freight cars, two types of flatcars, a three-dome tank car, a railway post office car, and a former Amtrak lounge car that is now used as a dining car.  The museum also leads bi-annual trips utilizing its cabooses from historical Enid area rail service.

The museum is built next to a freight yard.

Rolling stock (partial)
Frisco 1519
ATSF 999567
Union Pacific 25323
M-K-T (Katy) 132
Burlington Northern 12433 and 12181
Army medical service car 89526
Missouri Pacific caboose 13724

See also
 Enid City Railway
 Blackwell, Enid and Southwestern Railway
 Enid and Anadarko Railway
 Enid and Tonkawa Railway
 Enid Central Railway
 Denver, Enid and Gulf Railroad
 Enid-Pond Creek Railroad War
 National Register of Historic Places listings in Garfield County, Oklahoma

References

External links
The Railroad Museum of Oklahoma

Railroad museums in Oklahoma
Buildings and structures in Enid, Oklahoma
Museums in Garfield County, Oklahoma
Railway stations on the National Register of Historic Places in Oklahoma
National Register of Historic Places in Garfield County, Oklahoma
Tourist attractions in Enid, Oklahoma